Yellowstone is a BBC nature documentary series broadcast from 15 March 2009. Narrated by Peter Firth, the series takes a look at a year in the life of Yellowstone National Park, examining how its wildlife adapts to living in one of the harshest wildernesses on Earth. Yellowstone debuted on BBC Two at 8:00pm on Sunday 15 March 2009 and has three episodes. Each 50-minute episode was followed by a ten-minute film called Yellowstone People, featuring visitors to the Park and locals who had assisted the production team. The series was the channel's highest-rated natural history documentary in over five years with audiences peaking at over four million.

In the United States, an edited version of the series was broadcast under the title Yellowstone: Battle for Life. It aired as a two-hour TV special, and premiered on Animal Planet on 22 March 2009.

The series was one of the most popular titles at BBC Worldwide's annual market for international clients with pre-sales to nine territories including Spain (Canal+), Germany (WDR), Russia (Channel 1) and Italy (RTI).

Production
Yellowstone was commissioned by Roly Keating, then Controller of BBC Two, as a follow-up to the award-winning series Galápagos which aired in autumn 2006. Filming began in January 2007 and continued through the following four seasons. Filming techniques previously used for both Galapagos and Planet Earth were again put to good use, including shooting with high definition cameras and high-speed shooting to slow down fast action sequences. Stabilised camera mounts also enabled the team to capture natural animal behaviour from the air, as well as dramatic, wide angle landscape shots. Aerial cinematography was provided by Aerial Camera Systems.

Yellowstone was produced by the BBC Natural History Unit and Animal Planet. The executive producer was Mike Gunton and the series producer Andrew Murray. The British version was narrated by Peter Firth.

Episodes

Reception
The Daily Telegraph's David Horspool described the series as "amazingly shot" and a "work of art". Andrew Billen in The Times gave it five out of five, and TV Scoop described it as "majestic yet understated and consistently surprising".

Awards
At the 2009 Jackson Hole Wildlife Film Festival, Yellowstone gained the Best Series Award, and "Winter" gained the Best Wildlife Habitat Program award. It was also a finalist in the Best Cinematography category. 
At the 2009 International Wildlife Film Festival Awards, the series won the Best Cinematography and Best Ecosystem awards, and gained Merit Awards for Editing and Sound Design. Edmund Butt also won the Music – Original Title award at the 2009 Royal Television Society Craft and Design Awards. The series was nominated for the 2010 BAFTA Television Award for Best Specialist Factual. and won a craft BAFTA for Photography Factual in the same year.

References

External links
 
 

Animal Planet original programming
BBC television documentaries
BBC high definition shows
Documentary films about nature
Yellowstone National Park
2009 British television series debuts
2009 British television series endings